Thomas Jay (fl. 1406), of Wells, Somerset, was an English politician.

He was a Member (MP) of the Parliament of England for Wells in 1406.

References

14th-century births
15th-century deaths
English MPs 1406
People from Somerset